Timo Lienemann (born 15 May 1985 in Baden-Württemberg, Schorndorf) is a German racing driver. He has competed in such series as 3000 Pro Series, F3000 International Masters and Formula BMW ADAC.

References

External links
 Official website
 

1985 births
Living people
People from Schorndorf
Sportspeople from Stuttgart (region)
German racing drivers
Formula BMW ADAC drivers
German Formula Three Championship drivers
International Formula 3000 drivers
Racing drivers from Baden-Württemberg

Jo Zeller Racing drivers
Draco Racing drivers
Mücke Motorsport drivers